Maldita Sea, Vol. 1: 1989–1999 is a greatest hits album released by Maldita Vecindad y los Hijos del Quinto Patio. The best songs from their previous five albums are included on this compilation, as well as one track from a tribute album to José José.

Track listing

Disc 1
Morenaza
Rafael
Supermercado
Mujer
Toño
Kumbala
Pachuco
Solin (Live)
Pata De Perro (Live)
Un Poco De Sangre (Live)
Mojado (Live)

Disc 2
Don Palabras
Ojos Negros
El Dedo
El Chulo
La Tormenta
El Cocodrilo
El Tieso Y La Negra Soledad
El Barzon
Patineto
Lo Pasado Pasado
Sirena
Kumbala (Remix)

2000 compilation albums
Maldita Vecindad albums
Rock en Español compilation albums